Richard Herbert Rich (October 7, 1928, in Newark, New Jersey – March 28, 2008) was an All-Pro American football safety in the National Football League for the Baltimore Colts, Los Angeles Rams and New York Giants.

Early and personal life
Rich was born in Newark, New Jersey, and was Jewish. He graduated from Miami Beach High School in Florida.

He was married to the former Carla Blocker, and they had a son, Jonathan, and two daughters, Terry and Tracey. The family lived in Nashville, Tennessee.

College
He played college football at Vanderbilt University, as well as basketball and baseball, and was president of his class. In football, he earned All-SEC honors at tailback, rushing for 1,282 yards during the 1948–49 seasons.

Professional career
Rich was drafted in the sixth round of the 1950 NFL Draft, and played defensive back and returned punts during his career.  In his rookie season he averaged 23 yards on 12 punt returns, an NFL record that stood for over 50 years.  He was a two-time All-Pro defensive back. 

In 65 career games, he had 29 career interceptions, including three for touchdowns. In 1992, he was elected to the Tennessee Sports Hall of Fame. Rich also became Vanderbilt's seventh "SEC Football Legend".

After football
Rich was a 1954 graduate of Vanderbilt Law School.  After his football career ended, Rich was an attorney in Nashville. He was president of the Nashville Jewish Community Center in 1971-72, and was a board member of Temple Ohabai Sholom in Nashville.

Rich died at 79 years of age in 2008.

See also
List of select Jewish football players

References

External links

1928 births
2008 deaths
American football safeties
Baltimore Colts (1947–1950) players
Los Angeles Rams players
New York Giants players
Vanderbilt Commodores football players
Players of American football from Newark, New Jersey
Jewish American sportspeople